Hartonen is a Finnish surname. Notable people with the surname include:

Jukka Hartonen (born 1969), Finnish cross-country skier
Tommi Hartonen (born 1977), Finnish sprinter

Other uses
Hartonen, a village in Kivennapa

Finnish-language surnames